Roland Siegwart (born in 1959, Lausanne), is director of the Autonomous Systems Lab (ASL) in  Switzerland, of the Institute of Robotics and Intelligent Systems at ETH Zurich and a known robotics expert.

Early life

Siegwart was born in Lausanne and grew up in the Canton of Schwyz.  He received an MA in mechanical engineering from ETH Zurich in 1983 and, in 1989, a PhD degree with distinction Silver Medal ETH for his work on Electro-magnetically Suspended Milling Spindle with Active Digital Control.

Career

After completing his doctorate, Siegwart was employed as a research assistant at various universities (ETH Zurich, HTL Zurich (since 2001 ZHAW), Stanford University California) and, in 1990, became Vice-President R&D at MECOS Traxler AG. Since 1996, Siegwart is associated as full professor at EPFL Lausanne and, in 2006, of ETH Zurich. From 2010 to 2014, Siegwart was Vice President Research and Corporate Relations of ETH Zurich.

Siegwart's research activities focus on mobile robot design and navigation – localization and mapping, planning in dynamic environments, human–robot interaction, locomotion concepts for rough terrain, mobile micro-robots, space rovers, autonomous cars, and unmanned aerial vehicles.

Siegwart is founder and co-founder of various high-tech startups, such as Shockfish Communication Ltd. (1999), BlueBotics Ltd. (2001), or ALSTOM Inf> and Aspection Robotics Ltd. (2006).

Publications

References

External links
 IEEE RAS Pioneer Award Recipients
 

Swiss roboticists
1959 births
Living people
People from Lausanne
ETH Zurich alumni
Academic staff of ETH Zurich